Viktor Pešta (born July 15, 1990) is a Czech mixed martial artist who competes in the Heavyweight division of Konfrontacja Sztuk Walki (KSW). His name can be written as Pesta or Peshta.

Pešta was a Gladiator Championship Fighting Heavyweight Champion, WASO World Heavyweight Champion, Oktagon MMA Light heavyweight Champion and he competed in the Heavyweight division of the Ultimate Fighting Championship. He became  historically the second UFC fighter from the Czech Republic, after Karlos Vemola.

Mixed martial arts career

Early career
In 2006, Pešta started training Traditional Musado under the leadership of Vít Skalník. Traditional Musado is the civilian version of Musado, the close quarters combat system used by the Military of the Czech Republic. In 2008, he started training MMA under the leadership of Jiří Vesecký in the gym in Příbram, Bohemia.

Pešta moved to Prague to study at university and to pursue MMA career. In Prague, he began training in Penta Gym. He began amateur fighting at age of 18 and made his professional MMA debut in 2010.

His last fight in GCF was with longtime GCF Heavyweight Champion Lukáš Ťupa for the GFC Heavyweight Championship on December 7, 2013 at GCF 26: Fight Night. Pešta won in the first round by his signature move, strikes from the (side) mounted crucifix position and he became the new GCF Heavyweight Champion and #1 in Czech heavyweight rankings.

Ultimate Fighting Championship
Pešta became internationally well known for his website, letmebeyoursparringpartner.com. In February 2014, Pešta was offered a contract with the UFC.

Pešta made his debut against face fellow newcomer Ruslan Magomedov on May 31, 2014 at UFC Fight Night 41. He lost the fight via unanimous decision.

For his second fight with the promotion, Pešta faced touted newcomer Konstantin Erokhin on January 24, 2015 at UFC on Fox 14. Pešta won the fight by unanimous decision.

Pešta faced Derrick Lewis on October 3, 2015 at UFC 192. He lost the fight via TKO in the third round.

Pešta faced Marcin Tybura on August 6, 2016 at UFC Fight Night 92. He lost the fight via head kick KO in the second round.

Pešta was expected to face Damian Grabowski on January 15, 2017 at UFC Fight Night 103. However, Grabowski pulled out of the fight in late December for undisclosed reasons and was replaced by Alexey Oleynik. He lost the fight via submission in the first round.

In May 2017, Pešta was released from the company.

Fight Nights Global
He signed a contract with Fight Nights Global in the second part of year 2017 after one match at home organization XFN.

OKTAGON MMA
In 2019, Pešta signed with OKTAGON MMA and made his promotional debut against Mike Kyle at OKTAGON 13 on July 27, 2019. He won the fight via first-round submission.

He then challenged Michal Martínek for the OKTAGON MMA Heavyweight Championship at OKTAGON 15 on November 9, 2019. He lost the fight in the first round due to an injury.

Move down to Light Heavyweight
Pešta was expected to face Csaba Hocz at OKTAGON 16 on September 26, 2020. However, Pešta tested positive for COVID-19 and was replaced by Alexander Poppeck.

Pešta faced Ildemar Alcântara at OKTAGON 20 on December 30, 2020. He won the bout via TKO in the first round.

Pešta faced Riccardo Nosiglia at OKTAGON 24 on May 29, 2021. He won the bout via TKO after ground and pounding Nosiglia.

Pešta faced Stephan Puetz for the OKTAGON MMA Light Heavyweight Championship at OKTAGON 28 on September 25, 2021. He won the bout via doctor stoppage after the doctor ended the bout after the third round due to a nose injury.

Professional Fighters League 
Pešta faced Omari Akhmedov on April 23, 2022 at PFL 1. He lost the bout after getting knocked out in first round.

Pešta faced Rob Wilkinson on June 17, 2022 at PFL 4. He lost the bout via TKO stoppage in the first round.

Konfrontacja Sztuk Walki 
On January 9, 2023, it was announced that Pešta signed with KSW.

Personal life
Pešta's signature move, the (side) mounted crucifix position, was nicknamed/called "Bába pod kořenem" by his fans, after the famous Czech TV Nova's report about an elderly woman who gets stuck for 11 hours under the root of a tree overnight, 50 meters away from her rented hut in the forest and her friends.

Poor Honza, Pešta's Czech nickname, is a Czech fairy tale hero, similar to the English Jack, the German Hans (or Hänsel) or the Russian Ivan.

Championships and accomplishments
OKTAGON MMA
2021 OKTAGON MMA Light Heavyweight Champion
World Association of Sporting Organizations
2019 WASO World Heavyweight Champion
Gladiator Championship Fighting 
2013 GCF Heavyweight Champion

Mixed martial arts record

|-
|Loss
|align=center|18–8
|Rob Wilkinson
|TKO (punches)
|PFL 4
|
|align=center|1
|align=center|3:03
|Atlanta, Georgia, United States
|
|-
|Loss
|align=center|18–7
|Omari Akhmedov
|KO (punches)
|PFL 1
|
|align=center|1
|align=center|1:25
|Arlington, Texas, United States
|
|-
|Win
|align=center|18–6
|Stephan Puetz
|TKO (doctor stoppage)
|OKTAGON 28
|
|align=center|3
|align=center|5:00
|Prague, Czech Republic
|
|-
|Win
|align=center|17–6
|Riccardo Nosiglia
|TKO (punches)
|OKTAGON 24
|
|align=center|2
|align=center|0:50
|Brno, Czech Republic
|
|-
|Win
|align=center|16–6
|Ildemar Alcântara
|TKO (punches)
|OKTAGON 20
|
|align=center|1
|align=center|4:06
|Brno, Czech Republic
|Light Heavyweight debut.
|-
|Loss
|align=center|15–6
|Michal Martínek
|TKO (jaw injury)
|OKTAGON 15
|
|align=center|1
|align=center|2:49
|Prague, Czech Republic
|For the OKTAGON MMA Heavyweight Championship.
|-
|Win
|align=center|15–5
|Mike Kyle
|Submission (rear-naked choke)
|OKTAGON 13
|
|align=center|1
|align=center|1:59
|Prague, Czech Republic
|Catchweight (212 lbs) bout.
|-
|Win
|align=center|14–5
|Ivan Vitasović 
|Submission (rear-naked choke)
|Night of Warriors 15
|
|align=center|3
|align=center|3:16
|Liberec, Czech Republic
|
|-
|Loss
|align=center|13–5
|Alexander Emelianenko
|TKO (punches)
|RCC: Russian Cagefighting Championship 3
|
|align=center|2
|align=center|3:52
|Yekaterinburg, Russia
| 
|-
|Win
|align=center|13–4
|Alexander Gladkov
|Decision (unanimous)
|Fight Nights Global 84: Deák vs. Chupanov
|
|align=center|3
|align=center|5:00
|Bratislava, Slovakia
|
|-
|Win
|align=center|12–4
|Alexei Kudin
|Submission (rear-naked choke)
|Fight Nights Global 79: Pavlovich vs. Sidelnikov
|
|align=center|1
|align=center|4:52
|Penza, Russia
| 
|-
|Win
|align=center|11–4
|Michał Kita
|TKO (punches)
|XFN 3
|
|align=center|2
|align=center|4:39
|Prague, Czech Republic
| 
|-
|Loss
|align=center|10–4
|Aleksei Oleinik
|Submission (Ezekiel choke)
|UFC Fight Night: Rodríguez vs. Penn
|
|align=center|1
|align=center|2:57
|Phoenix, Arizona, United States
| 
|-
|Loss
|align=center|10–3
|Marcin Tybura
|KO (head kick)
|UFC Fight Night: Rodríguez vs. Caceres 
|
|align=center|2
|align=center|0:53
|Salt Lake City, Utah, United States
|
|-
|Loss
|align=center|10–2
|Derrick Lewis
|TKO (punches)
|UFC 192
|
|align=center|3
|align=center|1:15
|Houston, Texas, United States
|
|- 
|Win
|align=center|10–1
|Konstantin Erokhin
|Decision (unanimous)
|UFC on Fox: Gustafsson vs. Johnson
|
|align=center|3
|align=center|5:00
|Stockholm, Sweden
|
|-
|Loss
|align=center|9–1 
|Ruslan Magomedov
|Decision (unanimous)
|UFC Fight Night: Munoz vs. Mousasi
|
|align=center|3
|align=center|5:00
|Berlin, Germany
|
|-
|Win
|align=center|9–0 
|Lukáš Ťupa
|TKO (elbows)
|GCF 26: Fight Night
|
|align=center|1
|align=center|2:18
|Prague, Czech Republic
|
|-
|Win
|align=center|8–0 
|Yosef Ali Mohammad
|Decision (overturned)
|Heroes Fighting Championship 
|
|align=center|3
|align=center|5:00
|Halmstad, Sweden
|
|-
| Win
|align=center|7–0
|Saša Lazić
|TKO (punches)
|Heroes Gate 9
|
|align=center|1
|align=center|1:53
|Prague, Czech Republic
|
|-
| Win
|align=center|6–0
|Christian Colombo
|Submission (rear-naked choke)
|European MMA 1: Casino Fight Night 2
|
|align=center|2
|align=center|1:07
|Copenhagen, Denmark
|
|-
| Win
|align=center|5–0
|Zoran Krpan
|TKO (elbows)
|GCF 12: Cage Fight Brno 
|
|align=center|1
|align=center|2:16
|Brno, Czech Republic
|
|-
| Win
|align=center|4–0
|Lukáš Olejník
|Submission (rear-naked choke)
|GCF 8: Back in the Fight
|
|align=center|1
|align=center|1:01
|Příbram, Czech Republic
|
|-
| Win
|align=center|3–0
|Alexander Uhlíř
|TKO (punches)
|Warrior Night 3
|
|align=center|1
|align=center|3:59
|Kladno, Czech Republic
|
|-
| Win
|align=center|2–0
|Štefan Krajčí
|Decision (unanimous)
|GCF 2: All or Nothing
|
|align=center|3
|align=center|5:00
|Mladá Boleslav, Czech Republic
|
|-
| Win
|align=center|1–0
|Vít Mrákota
|Submission (armbar)
|GCF 1: Judgement Day
|
|align=center|1
|align=center|1:49
|Prague, Czech Republic
|
|-

Amateur record

|-
| Loss
|align=center|1-1
|Josef Říha 
| Decision
|Twins Cup  - Czech National Championship in Thaiboxing and MMA
|May 23, 2010
|align=center|2
|align=center|5:00
|Prague, Czech Republic
|
|-
| Win
|align=center|1-0
|Petr Horňák
| Submission (guillotine choke)
|Twins Cup  - Czech National Championship in Thaiboxing and MMA
|March 28, 2010
|align=center|2
|align=center|N/A
|Prague, Czech Republic
|

See also
 List of current KSW fighters
 List of male mixed martial artists

References

External links
Official UFC profile

Official website
Facebook
Twitter
Instagram

1990 births
Living people
People from Příbram
Czech male mixed martial artists
Heavyweight mixed martial artists
Mixed martial artists utilizing Musado
Ultimate Fighting Championship male fighters